Richard B. Dodson was a college football player.

University of Tennessee

Football
Dodson was a running back for the Tennessee Volunteers of the University of Tennessee from 1925 to 1927.

1927
Dan McGugin's Vanderbilt Commodores led 7–0 until a late Dick Dodson run tied the score. He was selected All-Southern in 1927. Dodson was considered the best of Southern backfields along with Bill Spears and Herdis McCrary.  That year Dodson set a record with a 91 yard run versus Transylvania. It's still the second longest run in Tennessee history, broken with a 99 yard run by Kelsey Finch against Florida in 1977. In the Tennessee-Vanderbilt game of '27, Dodson carried the ball but four times, yet was the main reason for Tennessee keeping the game a tie.

References

All-Southern college football players
Tennessee Volunteers football players
American football halfbacks
Year of birth missing